Medina Warda Aulia (born 7 July 1997 in Jakarta) is an Indonesian chess player. She has held the title of International Master since 2020, and Woman Grandmaster since 2013.

Achievements
 4th World Schools Chess Championships 2008 -Girls U11
 10th ASEAN+ Age-Group Championships - Girls 12 in 2010
 2nd Asean Chess Championships 2011 - Women
 Silver medal 2011 Southeast Asian Games Women's Individual Blitz Chess
 Bronze medal 2013 Southeast Asian Games Women's International Rapid and Women's International Blitz
 Gold medal 2021 Southeast Asian Games Women's Team Rapid

References

External links
 
 

1997 births
Living people
Indonesian female chess players
Chess woman grandmasters
People from Jakarta
Southeast Asian Games medalists in chess
Southeast Asian Games silver medalists for Indonesia
Southeast Asian Games bronze medalists for Indonesia
Competitors at the 2011 Southeast Asian Games
Competitors at the 2013 Southeast Asian Games
Competitors at the 2021 Southeast Asian Games
Southeast Asian Games gold medalists for Indonesia
21st-century Indonesian women